Sink or Swim is a 2018 French comedy film directed by Gilles Lellouche. It was screened out of competition at the 2018 Cannes Film Festival.

Cast
 Guillaume Canet as Laurent
 Virginie Efira as Delphine
 Mathieu Amalric as Bertrand
 Leïla Bekhti as Amanda
 Benoît Poelvoorde as Marcus
 Jean-Hugues Anglade as Simon
 Marina Foïs as Claire
 Jonathan Zaccaï as Thibault
 Philippe Katerine as Thierry
 Noée Abita as Lola

See also
 Allt flyter, a similar film from 2008
 Swimming with Men, a similar film from 2018

References

External links
 

2018 films
2018 comedy films
2010s French-language films
French comedy films
Synchronized swimming films
2010s French films